Daddu Prasad (born 5 October 1967) is an Indian politician  He was elected to the state of assembly in 1996, 2002 & 2007 Manikpur Sarhat in Chitrakoot district as a candidate of Bahujan Samaj Party (BSP) Daddu Prasad served as Rural Development Minister in the Uttar Pradesh government between 2007 and 2012.

and Member of the legislative assembly for three terms  daddu is a member of  the samaj wadi party which he joined  on 12 December 2021  after a long stint with Bahujan Samaj Party.

Political career 
Daddu Prasad  has been a MLA for three terms. He represented the Manikpur Sarhat constituency, He was previously a member of Bahujan Samaj Party and was elected in the assembly as a member of BSP. In 1996, 2002,2007 Prasad resigned from all party posts alleging Daddu Prasad "money for ticket" syndicate being run by the party.

Personal life 
Daddu Prasad is a Buddhist and an Ambedkarite, follower of B. R. Ambedkar. He converted to Buddhism from Hinduism.

References 

Samajwadi Party politicians
1967 births
Living people
Uttar Pradesh MLAs 1997–2002
Uttar Pradesh MLAs 2002–2007
Uttar Pradesh MLAs 2007–2012